Rhytiphora fraserensis is a species of beetle in the family Cerambycidae. It was described by Thomas Blackburn in 1892. It is known from Australia.

References

fraserensis
Beetles described in 1892
Taxa named by Thomas Blackburn (entomologist)